Take Five was a musical revue performed in 1957. Its songs included "Witchcraft" by Michael Brown, performed by Gerry Matthews.

(There is a different song, also entitled "Witchcraft", not associated with this revue.  It was performed by Frank Sinatra, and was written by Cy Coleman. Jonathan Tunick was credited as a co-composer, and Stephen Sondheim and Julius Monk also participated.)

References

Revues
Music venues completed in 1957
1957 in American music